A drive-by is a form of hit-and-run tactic, a personal attack carried out by an individual or individuals from a moving vehicle.

Drive-by or Drive By may also refer to:

Music
 Drive By (band), an American music group
 Drive-By, an American hip-hop duo, consisting of Anybody Killa and Blaze Ya Dead Homie; see Pony Down
 Drive By (album), a 2003 album by The Necks

Songs
 "Drive By" (song), a 2012 song by Train
 "Drive By", a song by Way Out West from Way Out West
 "Driveby", a song by Neil Young from Sleeps with Angels
 "Drive-by", a dialogue, heard on The Inbetweeners Soundtrack
 "Drive By", a 2001 song by The Jimmy Swift Band from Now They Will Know We Were Here

Other uses
 "Drive By" (Flight of the Conchords), the seventh episode of the television series Flight of the Conchords
 Drive by Shooting, 1987 album by Henry Rollins
 Drive-by download, kind of web threats with automated downloading and installing of trojan after visiting infected web page

See also